Wilkins and Davies Construction Co Ltd v Geraldine Borough [1958] NZLR 985 is a cited case in New Zealand regarding frustration of contract.

References

New Zealand contract case law